The Brunei River is a river which flows through Brunei and empties into the Brunei Bay towards the north-east direction. The Istana Nurul Iman, the official residence of the Sultan of Brunei, stands on its banks. The Brunei River is the shortest major river in Brunei. It is the major river basin within the Brunei-Muara District, the smallest but most populous district. It flows through the country's capital Bandar Seri Begawan. It is home to Kampong Ayer, the Brunei's traditional village on stilts above the river water.

History 
The Sultanate of Brunei once controlled all Borneo, including parts of the Philippines and Indonesia. The region's thick jungle means the method of transport and communication was always via boats. This led to traditional settlements being established beside rivers and waterways. These waterways provided convenient transport through a jungle environment, and a supply of food.

In 2006 the Brunei government through the Ministry of Environment, Parks and Recreation, a department initiated the clean-up campaign of the Brunei. A total of $3.9 million has been allocated for the clean-up project, in addition to the $90,000 for the house-to-house waste collection.

Sites 
Kampong Ayer is the traditional Bruneian village on stilts above the Brunei River. It was the traditional capital of Brunei for centuries during the Bruneian Sultanate and extended into the British protectorate. It is now part of the capital Bandar Seri Begawan, located across the city centre.

Some of Brunei's historical sites are located along the river banks, including:
 Kota Batu archaeological site, the primary archaeological site in the country
 Tomb of Sultan Sharif Ali, the 3rd Sultan of Brunei
 Tomb of Sultan Bolkiah, the 5th Sultan of Brunei
 Tomb of Sultan Muhammad Hasan, the 9th Sultan of Brunei
 , the tomb of Sultan Husin Kamaluddin, the 16th Sultan of Brunei
 The Royal Mausoleum which is the burial place for several Sultans of Brunei including Sultan Omar Ali Saifuddien III, the previous Sultan and father of Sultan Hassanal Bolkiah
 Bubungan Dua Belas (the House of Twelve Roofs), the official residence of the British residents and high commissioners during the British protectorate

The Brunei Museum, the country's national museum, is located in Kota Batu area, on the edge of a hill overlooking the river. Nearby, it is also home to the Malay Technology Museum, and the Brunei Darussalam Maritime Museum.

The Limau Manis River, a source river of the Brunei River, is home to Limau Manis archaeological site which is datable to the Chinese Song dynasty (960–1279 AD).

Istana Nurul Iman, the palace of Sultan Hassanal Bolkiah, the current Sultan of Brunei, is located on a hill overlooking the Brunei River.

The river is also home to Jong Batu, a rock outcrop believed to be the remains of a ship belonging to Nakhoda Manis, a figure associated with the local legend of an unfilial son cursed into stone. Similar tales can also be found in the local legends of Indonesia and Malaysia.

References  

Rivers of Brunei